The following lists events that happened during 2011 in Sudan.

Events

January
January 4 - President Omar al-Bashir has reassured that should South Sudan secede, his country will still help them in a visit to Juba.
January 5 - A Hungarian UN peacekeeper who was abducted 90 days ago is released.
January 7 - Thousands enter Southern Sudan from Sudan in preparation for the referendum for independence.
January 8 - Several people are killed in clashes with security police in southern Sudan before tomorrow's independence referendum in the south.
January 9 - People in southern Sudan vote in an independence referendum for the south.
January 10 - Three people are killed in clashes between government forces and the Sudan Liberation Movement in northern Darfur.
January 12 - Estimates put the turnout of the referendum for the south's independence at over 60%, passing the threshold for the result to be declared valid.
January 16 - Southern Sudanese leader Salva Kiir calls on the people of the south to forgive the north for the civil war.
January 18 - Three Sudanese military officers are killed in clashes with rebels in western Darfur.
January 21 - 21 people are killed in clashes between government forces and rebels in Darfur. In the south, almost 99% of voters support splitting from the north.
January 25 - The government and the Sudan Liberation Army clash for the second time in a week with claims by insurgents of shooting down helicopters killing 3. The government denies this claiming that 25 rebels were killed.
January 30 - Hundreds of protesters take to the streets inspired by the protests in Tunisia and Egypt in Khartoum against the government, demanding resignation of President al-Bashir. The protests are met with brutal force from riot police including tear gassing and beating.
January 31 - A student protester is killed by riot police in Khartoum. The south also declares it will secede from Sudan on July 9th, 2011 after a result of 99% in favour of independence.

February
February 2 - The Sudanese government accepts the results of the independence referendum in the south.
February 4 - Protesters in Sennar are beaten and tear gassed by riot police.
February 5 - 20 people are killed in a military shootout in Malakal in the south of the country.
February 6 - A mutiny in the Sudanese army in the south kills 30 people.
February 9 - Southern Sudanese minister Jimmy Lemi Milla and his bodyguard are shot dead as a result of a personal dispute.
February 10 - The truce in the south is broken as 16 people die in clashes in the state of Jonglei.
February 11 - The death toll from clashes between rebels loyal to George Athor and the military in southern Sudan rises to 100.
February 27 - A demonstration against electoral fraud in Khartoum is broken up by riot police.

March
March 8 - Rebels begin to protest after Sudan divides Darfur up into smaller states.
March 10 - Clashes between the government and rebels in Darfur kill 17 people.
March 12 - Southern Sudanese leaders accuse President al-Bashir of attempting overthrow their government.
March 18 - Clashes between rebels loyal to Athor and southern Sudan's government result in 70 deaths.

April
April 24 - 57 people are killed in clashes between the army and militia in the south.
April 28 - President al-Bashir threatens to not recognise South Sudan if they claim the Abyei region.

May
May 5 - The government passes a bill to approve the creation of two new states in Darfur's existing three, outraging rebels who see it as a way of the government to increase power.
May 10 - Over 80 people are killed in an attack by insurgents on a cattle camp in southern Sudan. In the Abyei region, 4 UN peacekeepers are shot.
May 18 - Sudanese jets bomb a village in Darfur according to the UN.
May 21 - Southern Sudan claims that Sudan has begun invading the Abyei region. The government takes control of it with the UN confirming the events.
May 22 - The United Nations Security Council demands that Sudan withdraw troops from Abyei.
May 24 - The UN reveals that over 20,000 people have fled Abyei to southern Sudan after the takeover of the region 3 days ago. In response to this, a southern minister resigns.
May 26 - Salva Kiir demands Sudan withdraw from Abyei and declares there will be no war.
May 31 - Kiir and al-Bashir agree to demilitarise the border at Abyei.

June
June 2 - Officials say nearly 100 people were killed in clashes between the north and south in Abyei.
June 3 - Two rebels are killed in clashes with the government in Darfur.
June 4 - Sudan dismisses UN calls to withdraw from Abyei.
June 5 - Fighting breaks out in South Kordofan between the north and south governments.
June 6 - Shooting is reported in the city of Kaduqli in South Kordofan.
June 7 - Fighting in South Kordofan kills 6 people.
June 10 - The south accuses the north of bombing a village in Unity State, killing 3.
June 19 - Monitors say the north is massing in South Kordofan amid tensions with the south.
June 20 - The north and south sign a ceasefire over Abyei with Ethiopian peacekeepers permitted in the region.
June 22 - President al-Bashir threatens to cut off pipelines of South Sudanese petroleum if a deal for oil is not agreed upon by July 1.
June 27 - A train carrying a southern Sudanese returnee in South Kordofan is attacked by northern Arab groups killing said returnee.
June 28 - President al-Bashir visits Beijing, China to discuss the south's independence that will soon be granted.

July
July 9 - The Republic of South Sudan secedes from Sudan becoming a sovereign state.
July 19 - A leaked UN report says there may have been war crimes committed in the conflict in South Kordofan.

August

September

October

November

December

References

 
Sudan
Years of the 21st century in Sudan
2010s in Sudan
Sudan